Dior is a French clothing retailer.

Dior may also refer to:
Dior (surname)

People with the given name
 Dior Angus (born 1994), English professional footballer

Music
 "Dior" (song), a song by American rapper Pop Smoke released in 2020
 "Dior", a song by American rapper Moneybagg Yo on his 2019 album 43va Heartless

Fictional characters
 Dior Eluchíl is a fictional character in J. R. R. Tolkien's legendarium, son of Lúthien and Beren, father of Elwing and grandfather of Elrond. Dior is also the name of a Ruling Steward of Gondor, according to the appendices of The Lord of the Rings

See also
 Diores (disambiguation)
 Diors, a village in the Indre department of France
 Lat-Dior, a Damel (king) in nineteenth century Sénégal